The Al Daouk family, originally the family can trace its roots back to al-Andalus or Andalusia, before the Reconquista took place.  ( Daaqa, meaning "to induce"),[1] also transliterated as (Daouk, Al Daouk and Daooq) is a prominent Beiruti family that stemmed in Ras Beirut, Lebanon during the 15th century; after fleeing Marrakesh, Morocco, the family escaped Morocco in the late 12th century from Marrakesh to the Levant during the Reconquista inquisition. The immigration came as a consequence of the heavy influx of refugees from the Iberian Peninsula.  This was due to the heavy influx of Arab refugees coming from the Iberian Peninsula to the Maghreb and the Levant following the fall of Al-Andalus to the Catholic Monarchs.

The family would then become one of Beirut's prominent families after a truce that would bind them to the 'Seven Families of Beirut' agreement of 1350 (disputed with 1351). The agreement was a written one, which engulfed the houses of: Sinno, Kreidiyyeh, Itani, Doughan, Mneimneh and the Houry family alongside the Daouk family. Although the original agreement has been lost in history, the legacy of this agreement survives until the present day. This is given by the fact that most of Beirut's original families descend from, or are related to one of the Seven Families. The families’ names however, were not necessarily written and spelled the same as they are known to be today. The Daouks initially arrived to Beirut as the ‘Dawakites’ or الدواكة and eventually became the house of Daouk or آل الداعوق.

The agreement of 1350 allowed the Seven Families to act as a single body to govern and protect Beirut. The Seven Families subsequently signed an agreement with the ruling Mamluk Sultanate of Egypt. The agreement conferred that they would administer Beirut's internal affairs and protect its people, while the Mamluks under Prince Soudoon I, would handle the military aspects within and outside Beirut. The agreement was a mean of protecting Beirut from foreign powers. 

It also ensured that all Beirutis would be entrusted with the protection of Beirut and therefore would be able to become one of the seven families that may caretake a gate. However, the Seven Families retained this entitlement mostly if not not every time for unknown reasons. It is mostly agreed on the grounds that these families were known as the ‘Omana’, the trustworthy ones. The agreement would stay enacted throughout the era of the Mamluk Sultanate of Egypt, which spanned between 1250 to 1517, until its downfall at the hands of the Ottoman Empire.

Introduction 

The Daouk Family is known as one of the 'Seven Families of Beirut' along the other six families; the Mneimneh Family, the Sinno Family, the Kreidiyyeh Family, the Itani Family, the Doughan Family and the Houry Family. The Daouk Family members mostly reside in Ras Beirut and other districts within the Lebanese Capital. Other smaller communities of the family may also reside in California, Ontario, Quebec, Marrakesh and Syrian cities such as Damascus and Hama. The majority of the family adhere to either the Sunni faith of Islam or Christianity.

Current 

As of today, the family is mostly known for the Izzat Daouk franchise and Mohammad Amin Daouk who is the President of Nejmeh SC, one of the oldest and most successful Lebanese football clubs. Other influential members include Walid Daouk who was the Information Minister of Lebanon in 2011 and Amine Mohammad Daouk, the president of the Makassed Organization.

The social status of the family has been prominent throughout the past two centuries especially in Lebanese governance and politics. The most two notable members are Omar Beik Daouk and Ahmad Daouk. Omar served as the first Head of State of Beirut throughout the Ottoman Era. Ahmad Daouk was the Prime Minister of Lebanon in 1941 and 1960; he was also Minister of National Defense in his own cabinet. During his period as Prime Minister, Lebanon enjoyed very close relationships and alliances with the United States and France.

Omar Daouk had 2 sons, Mohamed and Hasan. Hasan Omar Daouk's wife, Hassana Fathallah-Daouk, was a prominent philanthropist member of several cultural organizations, such as the Lebanese Red Cross. She was also president of the Child and Mother Welfare Society, which runs a hospital, senior housing, and a development and career training center promoting the health and social success of modest income families in Beirut. She has a street named after her near the headquarters of that organization. Hassana was awarded the Lebanese Golden Medal of Achievement, the highest civilian honor awarded by the Republic of Lebanon.

The family's members currently run an annual event by where all members of the extensive family meet each  and get to know each other. Such events are regularly hosted in Beirut's Movenpick Hotel. The Lebanese sweet 'Daoukieh' was named after the family due to its creator who was Daouk.

May Daouk currently owns one of Beirut's mostly beautiful and rare villas. Its uniqueness comes from the fact that the villa is a blend of traditional Beiruti-Lebanese architecture with a hint of a modern touch of May's choice. The villa has been featured on many websites and social media networks such as Pinterest and Architectural Digest.

Legacy 
The legacy of the Daouk Family is one that is noteworthy, to the extent that two streets in the Beirut Central District are named after them. Omar Daouk Street is situated at the heart of the Lebanese Capital minutes away from Downtown Beirut (Coordinates:   33°53'55"N   35°29'53"E.) The street consists of two parallel roads, with residential and commercial buildings in between the roads that merge at the Omar Daouk Square. "The Omar Daouk Square was designed by Mohammad Halawi around a bust by Maguerditch Mazmanian of Omar Daouk himself. With the aim of upgrading the square from a green island into a space connected to the surroundings, the new design of the Omar Daouk Square enlarges its size, introduces three terraces to soften the site incline, and creates an attractive open area where one can sit and rest." Ahmad Daouk Street (Coordinates: 33°54'3.61"N35°30'0.00" E) is perpendicular to Bab Idriss, which is connected to Omar Daouk Street. The street is two blocks from the Lebanese parliament and consists of a double-way two lane road connecting Beirut's Corniche Road to the Beirut Central District.

The Daouk Family historically resided in The Rose House in Ras Beirut. Alongside the Adrati Family, the Daouk Family preserved the Beirut landmark that was built in 1882 having settled in the villa for nearly three decades. Today it is currently owned outside the family by Hisham Jaroudi.

Notable Members of the Daouk Family 
Ahmad Daouk: Prime Minister of Lebanon in 1941 and 1960; he was also Minister of National Defense in his own cabinet.

Amine Mohammad Daouk: Lebanese engineer that graduated from Massachusetts Institute of Technology. He is the president of the Makassed Philanthropic Islamic Association of Beirut.

Ghaleb Daouk: Lebanese doctor that graduated from Massachusetts Institute of Technology who currently works in the Harvard Medical School.

Izzat Daouk: Founder of the Izzat Daouk Franchise, he is the first Lebanese businessman to internationally commercialize cosmetics and beauty care from Lebanon.
.

Khaled Daouk: Ireland's Honorary Consul General in Beirut from 1988 until 2008. He is also a prominent Lebanese businessman.

Maher Daouk: Lebanese businessman and member of Solidere board of directors since May 1994.

May Daouk: Lebanese architect notable for her works on May Daouk's Beirut Villas. She is a graduate of Institut Le Rosey.

Mohammad Amin Daouk: Lebanese businessman and current President of Nejmeh SC, one of the oldest and most successful Lebanese football clubs in the Lebanese Premiere League.

Walid Daouk: Former Information Minister of Lebanon in 2011 and a businessman.

Photo gallery

References 

Daouk